Dibër District was one of the 36 districts of Albania, which were dissolved in July 2000 and replaced by 12 counties. It is in the northeast of the country, and its capital was Peshkopi.

Administrative divisions
The district consisted of the following municipalities:

Arras
Fushë-Çidhën
Kala e Dodës
Kastriot
Lurë
Luzni
Maqellarë
Melan
Muhurr
Peshkopi
Qendër Tomin
Selishtë
Sllovë
Zall-Dardhë
Zall-Reç

Notable people
Skanderbeg
Gjon Kastrioti
Fiqri Dine

References

Districts of Albania
Geography of Dibër County